Giles Langley was a Welsh Anglican priest in the 16th century.

Langley was  educated at Christ Church, Oxford. He held livings at Chieveley, Welford and Shabbington.  Langford was appointed Archdeacon of Llandaff in 1564.

Notes

16th-century Welsh Anglican priests
Archdeacons of Llandaff
Alumni of Christ Church, Oxford